Oluaso was an Oyo king known for his handsome and strong physique. Legends of his reign describe it as one of peace, longevity and love. He built numerous palaces in the empire and also had numerous wives and children.

References
Samuel Johnson, Obadiah Johnson. The History of the Yorubas, From the Earliest of Times to the Beginning of the British Protectorate. p 158

Alaafins of Oyo